German submarine U-454 was a Type VIIC U-boat of Nazi Germany's Kriegsmarine during World War II.

She carried out ten patrols. She sank two ships and damaged one more.

She was sunk in the Bay of Biscay by an Australian aircraft on 1 August 1943.

Design
German Type VIIC submarines were preceded by the shorter Type VIIB submarines. U-454 had a displacement of  when at the surface and  while submerged. She had two shafts and two  propellers.

U-454 was fitted with five  torpedo tubes (four fitted at the bow and one at the stern), fourteen torpedoes, one  SK C/35 naval gun, 220 rounds, and a  C/30 anti-aircraft gun. The boat had a complement of between forty-four and sixty.

Service history
The submarine was laid down on 4 July 1940 in the Deutsche Werke, Kiel as yard number 285, launched on 30 April 1941 and commissioned on 24 July under the command of Kapitänleutnant Burkhard Hackländer.

She served with the 5th U-boat Flotilla from 24 July 1941 for training and the 7th flotilla from 1 November for operations.

First patrol
U-454s first patrol was preceded by the short journey from Kiel in Germany to Kirkenes in Norway not far from the border with Russia. The patrol itself commenced with her departure from Kirkenes on 25 December 1941.

That same day, she damaged the British registered Harmatis and sank the British destroyer . The warship was hit in the stern by a torpedo, which caused her magazines to explode; the vessel sank in two minutes. The loss of life was made worse by the detonation of her depth charges and men freezing to death in the icy water.

Second and third patrols
Her second sortie terminated in Trondheim on 3 February 1942 and had covered the Barents Sea.

The submarine's third patrol was marred by the loss overboard of Matrosengefreiter Josef Kauerlos on 26 February 1942.

Fourth and fifth patrols
The boat's fourth patrol was also carried out in the Barents Sea.

Her fifth foray was toward Bear Island between 8 and 20 April 1942.

Sixth patrol
Two more short trips were carried out from Kirkenes and Bergen and finished in Kiel, from where she proceeded via the gap separating Iceland from the Faroe Islands into the Atlantic Ocean. She went as far west as Newfoundland before arriving at St. Nazaire in occupied France on 17 August 1942.

Seventh and eighth patrols
Patrol number seven started and finished in St. Nazaire and at 73 days, was the boat's longest.

Her eighth sortie was relatively uneventful; the area negotiated was west of Ireland and north of the Azores.

Ninth patrol
U-454 left St. Nazaire on 17 April 1943. On 10 May, she encountered a Fairey Swordfish from the escort carrier . No damage was incurred, but the U-boat was forced to dive. She returned to France, but this time to La Pallice, on 23 May.

Tenth patrol and loss
U-454 was sunk in the Bay of Biscay by depth charges dropped by an Australian Sunderland flying boat of No. 10 Squadron RAAF on 1 August 1943. The aircraft crashed, the U-boat was on her way to the Mediterranean when she met her fate.

Thirty-two men died; there were 14 survivors.

Wolfpacks
U-454 took part in 19 wolfpacks, namely:
 Ulan (25 December 1941 – 18 January 1942)
 Aufnahme (7 – 10 March 1942)
 Umhang (10 – 15 March 1942)
 Eiswolf (28 – 31 March 1942)
 Robbenschlag (8 – 14 April 1942)
 Blutrausch (15 – 19 April 1942)
 Wolf (13 – 30 July 1942)
 Pirat (30 July – 3 August 1942)
 Steinbrinck (3 – 11 August 1942)
 Panther (6 – 20 October 1942)
 Veilchen (20 October – 7 November 1942)
 Kreuzotter (9 – 18 November 1942)
 Landsknecht (20 – 28 January 1943)
 Pfeil (1 – 9 February 1943)
 Ritter (16 – 23 February 1943)
 Amsel (26 April – 3 May 1943)
 Amsel 4 (3 – 6 May 1943)
 Rhein (7 – 10 May 1943)
 Elbe 2 (10 – 14 May 1943)

Summary of raiding history

References

Notes

Citations

Bibliography

External links
 
 

German Type VIIC submarines
U-boats commissioned in 1941
U-boats sunk in 1943
U-boats sunk by Australian aircraft
U-boats sunk by depth charges
1941 ships
Ships built in Kiel
World War II submarines of Germany
Maritime incidents in August 1943